The 2017 Southern Illinois Salukis football team represented Southern Illinois University Carbondale as a member of the Missouri Valley Football Conference (MVFC) during the 2017 NCAA Division I FCS football season. Led by second-year head coach Nick Hill, the Salukis compiled an overall record of 4–7 with a mark of 2–6 in conference play, tying for eighth place in the MVFC. Southern Illinois played home games at Saluki Stadium in Carbondale, Illinois.

Schedule

Game summaries

Mississippi Valley State

at Southeast Missouri State

at Memphis

Northern Iowa

at South Dakota State

Illinois State

at Indiana State

at South Dakota

Missouri State

Youngstown State

at Western Illinois

References

Southern Illinois
Southern Illinois Salukis football seasons
Southern Illinois Salukis football